Tomohiko is a masculine Japanese given name.

Possible writings
Tomohiko can be written using different combinations of kanji characters. Some examples:

友彦, "friend, elegant boy"
友比古, "friend, young man (archaic)"
知彦, "know, elegant boy"
知比古, "know, young man (archaic)"
智彦, "intellect, elegant boy"
智比古, "intellect, young man (archaic)"
共彦, "together, elegant boy"
共比古, "together, young man (archaic)"
朋彦, "companion, elegant boy"
朋比古, "companion, young man (archaic)"
朝彦, "morning/dynasty, elegant boy"
朝比古, "morning/dynasty, young man (archaic)"

The name can also be written in hiragana ともひこ or katakana トモヒコ.

Notable people with the name
, Filipino-Japanese judoka
, Japanese footballer
, Japanese footballer
, Japanese anime director
, Japanese footballer
, Japanese guitarist
, Japanese footballer
, Japanese footballer
, Japanese vert skater
, Japanese physician and virologist
, Grand Steward of the Imperial Household Agency

Japanese masculine given names